Shaul Bakhash (in ), is an Iranian-American historian in Iranian studies at George Mason University where he is a "Clarence J. Robinson Professor of History."

Bakhash is Jewish and was born in Iran. He is a former Guggenheim Fellow as well as a fellow at the Institute for Advanced Study in Princeton, New Jersey. He received his MA from Harvard University and his DPhil from the University of Oxford.

His publications focus on Iran and its history and politics. He serves on the Board of Advisory Editors of The Middle East Journal. Bakhash is also a visiting fellow at Brookings Institution's Saban Center for Middle East Policy, where he will be focusing on "the prospects for internal reform in Iran".

He is married to the Iranian-American Middle East studies scholar Haleh Esfandiari.

See also
Iranistics

References

External links
George Mason University bio page
American Academy in Berlin page

Year of birth missing (living people)
Alumni of the University of Oxford
Iranian emigrants to the United States
Living people
Iranologists
American people of Iranian-Jewish descent
Iranian Jews
Harvard University alumni
George Mason University faculty
Place of birth missing (living people)
Iranian expatriate academics